Blueberry Island is an inhabited island in Worcester County, Massachusetts. It is surrounded by Lake Monomonac, an artificial lake that straddles the border between Rindge, New Hampshire, and Winchendon, Massachusetts.

References

Islands of Worcester County, Massachusetts
Populated places in Worcester County, Massachusetts